Chuck Wein (March 24, 1939March 18, 2008) was an American promoter and manager of entertainment acts whose celebrity stemmed from his five-year (1964–1969) association with Andy Warhol and from his discovery of Edie Sedgwick who became a Warhol superstar of 1965. He was also a film director.

Life
Wein graduated from Pittsburgh's Taylor Allderdice High School in 1956. He lived in Cambridge, Massachusetts, where he attended Harvard, graduating in 1961. A thesis he had written, centering on Pirandello's Six Characters in Search of an Author, remained as a particular source of pride for him. Continuing to reside in Cambridge, he affected the appearance of an 1890s Edwardian dandy, similar to that of the British Teddy Boys, was a successful racetrack bettor and lived what was described as a Bohemian lifestyle. In 1963, while at his therapist's office, he met Radcliffe student Edie Sedgwick and when, upon turning 21 in 1964, she moved to New York, he went with her and began acting as her promoter. Gifted with a glib vocabulary and blond good looks, he insinuated himself into Andy Warhol's circle of intimates and, by January 1965, had introduced Edie Sedgwick to Warhol and began regularly taking her to Warhol's studio, The Factory.

The celebrity-obsessed Warhol and Sedgwick quickly became fascinated with each other and, by the time Warhol invited Wein and Sedgwick to accompany him to Paris in April 1965 for the opening of an exhibition of his paintings, he announced that Edie Sedgwick would be his new "superstar" and the "Queen of The Factory". Wein wrote and became Warhol's assistant director on Beauty No. 2, a 65-minute feature which presents a barely dressed Sedgwick in bed with Warhol regular Gino Piserchio, reacting and responding to the off-screen voice of the never-shown Wein who harasses her with intimate and annoying questions and comments which Piserchio does not seem to hear or be aware of. The film premiered at the Paris Cinémathèque in July 1965, making Warhol and Sedgwick darlings of the international celebrity circuit, with Wein and Piserchio also basking in the spotlight.

The years 1965 and early 1966 represented the peak period for the Warhol-Sedgwick-Wein collaboration, resulting in nine films, but before the end of the year, a disillusioned Edie Sedgwick left Warhol, never to return. Little more than two years later, in the wake of Warhol's diminished activity following his near-fatal shooting by Valerie Solanas on June 3, 1968, Wein also departed and began traveling the world, with particular emphasis on the Far East, and managing fringe nightclub acts which usually had some unusual, strange or whimsical characteristics, as well as focusing on the occult. He can be seen in the 1967 documentary short about Warhol, Superartist and, in 1971, was credited as director of the Jimi Hendrix concert film Rainbow Bridge.

Although the day and month of his birth have remained elusive (although see the IMDb entry below), Wein would have marked his 68th (69th?) birthday in 2008, the year he died in Del Mar, California, fifteen months after the release of Factory Girl, director George Hickenlooper's cinematic retelling of Edie Sedgwick's (Sienna Miller) brief life, with particular emphasis on her time with Warhol (Guy Pearce) and Wein, whose portrayal by Jimmy Fallon was tepidly noted by critics as being "convincing" and "adequate".

Filmography

Wein directed the 1971 musical New Age documentary film Rainbow Bridge, which concluded with a concert of Jimi Hendrix playing in Maui near Haleakalā.
In 2020 a documentary film titled Music, Money, Madness... Jimi Hendrix Live In Maui was released containing many interviewees who were instrumental in the creation of Rainbow Bridge, including footage of Wein and excerpts of the Rainbow Bridge performance by the Jimi Hendrix Experience.

References

External links

Harvard University alumni
1939 births
2008 deaths
Place of birth missing
People associated with The Factory
Taylor Allderdice High School alumni
Film directors from Pennsylvania